Tropical Storm Vongfong affected China after a deadly flood season. The 14th named storm of the 2002 Pacific typhoon season, Vongfong developed as a tropical depression on August 10. Initially it was disorganized due to hostile conditions, and it failed to intensify significantly before crossing the Philippine island of Luzon. There, flooding forced 3,500 people to evacuate their homes. In the Philippines, the storm killed 35 people and caused $3.3 million in damage. 

After affecting the Philippines, the tropical depression dissipated in the South China Sea, although it reformed on August 15. It moved northwestward, strengthening into Tropical Storm Vongfong. It brushed eastern Hainan before making landfall on August 19 in southern China near Wuchuan, Guangdong. Soon after it dissipated, the storm dropped heavy rainfall across the region, causing one traffic accident in Hong Kong and killing twelve people due to landslides. The storm destroyed 6,000 houses, mostly in Guangdong, and damage in the country totaled at least $86 million.

Meteorological history

On August 8, an area of convection, or thunderstorms, formed to the west-northwest of Palau, with a weak circulation connected to the monsoon trough. The system had good outflow, although it was initially within an area of increasing moderate wind shear, which limited organization. Convection increased, and although the circulation was exposed, the shear later decreased enough for the system to organize into a tropical depression on August 10; the Joint Typhoon Warning Center (JTWC) labeled it as Tropical Depression 18W, the Japan Meteorological Agency (JMA)  labeled it as an unnumbered depression, and the Philippine Atmospheric, Geophysical and Astronomical Services Administration (PAGASA) gave it the name Tropical Depression Milenyo. 

Upon developing, the depression was located in an area of weak steering currents, still connected to the monsoon rough, and it moved slowly to the west-northwest. The thunderstorms continued to be sheared to the west of the circulation, which limited strengthening. On August 12, the JTWC briefly upgraded the system to a tropical storm after a temporary increase in thunderstorms, although the system soon weakened. A ridge to the north caused a general westward track toward the Philippines. With a fully exposed circulation, the depression made landfall at 0800 UTC on August 13 near Infanta on the Philippine island of Luzon. It soon dissipated due to continued shear and land interaction. The remnants continued westward into the South China Sea, and PAGASA and JMA both discontinued advisories early on August 14. However, on August 15, a tropical depression re-developed halfway between Vietnam and the Philippines, with a circulation exposed from the convection due to moderate wind shear. That day, the JTWC initiated advisories on Tropical Depression 20W.

After redevelopment, wind shear continued to be a problem, with convection located southwest of the center. Early on August 17, a pulse in the monsoon increased thunderstorms and allowed the system to become better organized. The convection became more concentrated and the circulation less exposed. As a result, the JMA upgraded the depression to Tropical Storm Vongfong early on August 18, still in the central South China Sea. Around that time, the storm began moving more quickly to the northwest due to a developing ridge to its northeast. Although the JMA estimated peak 10–minute sustained winds of only 75 km/h (45 mph), the JTWC assessed Vongfong as continuing to intensify to peak 1–minute winds of 100 km/h (65 mph), early on August 19. By that time, the storm was near Hainan, and at 1240 UTC that day, Vongfong made landfall in southern China near Wuchuan, Guangdong. It quickly weakened over land, dissipating early on August 20 to the west of Guilin.

Preparations and impact

Heavy rains from the storm affected the Philippines, causing flooding that forced 3,500 people to evacuate their houses. This occurred after a month of heavy rainfall from several tropical cyclones in July. Officials closed schools and advised small boats to remain at port. A vessel capsized offshore Antique Province, and its crew of 15 was rescued. At least six people died due to electrocution, after downed power lines touched floodwaters. The storm spawned a tornado and caused landslides in Negros Oriental. The storm killed 35 people in the country and injured 22 others. Damage was estimated at $3.3 million (₱172 million 2002 PHP). Milenyo was the final storm to be named by PAGASA during 2002.

On August 17, the Hong Kong Observatory (HKO) issued standby signal number 1 due to the storm's reformation in the South China Sea. Vongfong made landfall west of the territory, although its outer rainbands spread across the region. Slick roads contributed to a traffic accident in Sai Kung in which one person was killed. Rainfall in Hong Kong reached  in the town of Kwai Chung. The storm downed a few trees across the territory, and a fallen branch injured one man. Another person was injured by a damaged awning. 

In Hainan, the threat from Vongfong prompted officials to close the primary airport and to restrict sea traffic with Guangdong. As a result, 113 flights were delayed, stranding more than 3,000 people. In the city, the storm downed 2,145 trees, and damage was estimated at $456,000 (¥3.8 million CNY. Rains spread as far north as Hunan, where previous flooding prompted a state of emergency. In neighboring Jiangxi, floods caused the Yangtze River to crest above warning levels in Jiujiang. River levels also rose in Liuzhou in Guangxi. Wind gusts as strong as 144 km/h (90 mph) were reported in Zhanjiang, and a station in Guangxi reported gusts to 115 km/h (71 mph). The storm caused flooding and landslides that damaged thousands of houses. Some areas lost electricity during the storm, and the storm disrupted traffic in the region. Vongfong flooded  of crop fields, and storm flooding also damaged hundreds of reservoirs. Vongfong destroyed 5,600 houses in Guangdong, many of them in Zhanjiang, and provincial damage there was estimated at $46 million (¥382 million CNY). In Guangxi, the storm killed twelve people, eight due to landslides. At least 400 houses were destroyed in Guangxi, and damage in the province was estimated at over $36.2 million (¥300 million CNY).

Notes

References

External links

JMA General Information of Tropical Storm Vongfong (0214) from Digital Typhoon
JMA Best Track Data of Tropical Storm Vongfong (0214) 
JMA Best Track Data (Graphics) of Tropical Storm Vongfong (0214)
JMA Best Track Data (Text)
JTWC Best Track Data of Tropical Storm 18W (Vongfong)
JTWC Best Track Data of Tropical Storm 20W (Vongfong)
18W.NONAME from the U.S. Naval Research Laboratory
20W.VONGFONG from the U.S. Naval Research Laboratory

2002 Pacific typhoon season
Typhoons in the Philippines
Typhoons in China
Western Pacific tropical storms
Vongfong